is a district located in the northern portion of Meguro, Tokyo, Japan, which consists of 1 to 4-chōme. As of October 1, 2020, it has a total population of 8,362.

Geography
The Aobadai district borders Shinsenchō, Nanpeidaichō, Hachiyamachō, and Sarugakuchō on the north across ; Kamimeguro on the south; and Higashiyama, Ōhashi, Komaba on the west and northwest across .

It was named so because Saigō Tsugumichi, a Meiji-period politician and a younger brother of Saigō Takamori, owned a mansion there.

Places of interest

Embassies
 Embassy of Egypt (Aobadai 1-5-4)
 Embassy of Senegal (Aobadai 1-3-4)

Other
 Japan Map Center (Aobadai 4-9-6)

Education
Meguro City Board of Education operates public elementary and junior high schools.

All of Aobadai 2-4-chome and part of 1-chome are zoned to Sugekari Elementary School (菅刈小学校) and No. 1 Junior High School (第一中学校). Parts of 1-chome are zoned to Karasumori Elementary School (烏森小学校) and Higashiyama Junior High School (東山中学校).

Aobadai is home to an 1875-established elementary school, .

The institution of higher education located in this district is Sanno University. Although its main campus is located in Isehara, Kanagawa, the university maintains the "Daikanyama Campus" in this district. The Aoba - Japan International School is also located in Aobadai.

References

Districts of Meguro